William Joseph Shields (10 March 1888 – 4 January 1961), known professionally as Barry Fitzgerald, was an Irish stage, film and television actor. In a career spanning almost forty years, he appeared in such notable films as Bringing Up Baby  (1938), The Long Voyage Home (1940), How Green Was My Valley  (1941), The Sea Wolf (1941), Going My Way (1944), None but the Lonely Heart  (1944) and The Quiet Man (1952). For Going My Way (1944), he won the Academy Award for Best Supporting Actor and was simultaneously nominated for the Academy Award for Best Actor.  He was the older brother of Irish actor Arthur Shields. In 2020, he was listed at number 11 on The Irish Times list of Ireland's greatest film actors.

Early life

Fitzgerald was born William Joseph Shields in Walworth Road, Portobello, Dublin, Ireland, the son of Fanny Sophia (née Ungerland) and Adolphus Shields. His father was Irish and his mother was German. He was the older brother of Irish actor Arthur Shields.

He attended Skerry's College in Dublin before going on to work in the civil service, starting as a junior clerk at the Dublin Board of Trade in 1911. He later went to work for the unemployment office. "It was an easy job, full of leisure," he later said.

Career

Abbey Theatre
Interested in acting, he began appearing in amateur dramatic societies such as the Kincora Players. He joined his brother Arthur Shields in the Abbey in 1915. He chose the stage name Barry Fitzgerald so as not to get in trouble with his superiors in the civil service.

Fitzgerald's early appearances at the Abbey included bit parts in plays such as The Casting Out of Martin Whelan and a four-word part in The Critic.

His breakthrough performance at the Abbey came in 1919, when he was in The Dragon by Lady Gregory. However he continued to act part-time until 1929, keeping his job at the civil service during the day. He was in The Bribe, An Imaginary Conversation, John Bull's Other Island and others.
 
In 1924, Fitzgerald's salary at the Abbey was £2'10 a week. That year he appeared in the world premiere of Juno and the Paycock by famed playwright Seán O'Casey. Fitzgerald played Captain Jack Boyle.

He received much acclaim for his performance in Paul Twyning during 1925. The following year he was in the premiere of O'Casey's The Plough and the Stars, playing Fluther Good. The play was controversial, causing riots and protests. One night in February 1926, three gunmen turned up to Fitzgerald's mother's house intending to kidnap him and prevent the play from being performed, but they were unable to find him.

In 1926,  Fitzgerald was in The Would-Be Gentleman. Other appearances at the Abbey included The Far Off Hills, Shadow of a Gunman and The Playboy.

O'Casey wrote a part especially for Fitzgerald in the play The Silver Tassie, but it was rejected by the Abbey. The play was picked up for production in London in 1929. Fitzgerald decided to leave his civil service job to join the production and at age 41, he became a full-time actor.

Professional actor
Fitzergald made his film debut in Alfred Hitchcock's version of Juno and the Paycock (1930), shot in London.

In early 1931, Fitzgerald  toured England in a production of Paul Twyning. He returned to Ireland in June of that year to perform the play at the Abbey. Between 1931 and 1936, he appeared in three plays by Irish playwright Teresa DeevyA Disciple, In Search of Valour and Katie Rochewhich were also Abbey Theatre productions.

In 1932, Fitzgerald traveled to the United States with the Abbey Players to appear in Things That Are Caesar's and The Far-off Hills.

Fitzgerald and the Players returned to the US in 1934 to tour a series of plays in repertory around the country. These included The Plough and the Stars, Drama at Inish, The Far-off Hills, Look at the Heffernans, The Playboy of the Western World, The Shadow of the Glen, Church Street, The Well of the Saints and Juno and the Paycock.

Fitzgerald appeared in a short Irish silent film, Guests of the Nation, released only in Ireland in 1935. The film was not seen or distributed outside of Ireland until 2011.

Hollywood
In March 1936, Fitzgerald and three other members of the Abbey arrived in Hollywood to star in the film version of The Plough and the Stars (1936), directed by John Ford. Fitzgerald decided to remain in Hollywood where he soon found constant employment as a character actor. He had support roles in Ebb Tide (1937) at Paramount, Bringing Up Baby (1938) at RKO, Four Men and a Prayer (1938) directed by John Ford for 20th Century-Fox, and The Dawn Patrol (1938) at Warner Bros.

Fitzgerald made a series of films at RKO: Pacific Liner (1939) with Victor McLaglen, and two directed by John Farrow, The Saint Strikes Back (1939) and Full Confession (1939). In between the two Farrow films, Fitzgerald returned to Broadway in 1939 in The White Steed.

After Full Confession Fitzgerald went back to Broadway with Kindred  (1939–40) and a revival of Juno and the Paycock (1940) which went for 105 performances.

Back in Hollywood, Fitzgerald was reunited with John Ford in The Long Voyage Home (1940). He appeared in San Francisco Docks (1940) at Universal and The Sea Wolf (1941) at Warner Bros., before making another film with Ford, How Green Was My Valley (1941), for Fox.  He went to Metro-Goldwyn-Mayer for Tarzan's Secret Treasure (1941).

Fitzgerald and Shields starred in  Tanyard Street (1941) on Broadway, directed by Shields, which only had a short run. However Fitzgerald's personal notices were excellent, the New York Times calling him "the incarnation of the comic spirit. People start laughing the moment he pokes his squint face on set."

Back in Hollywood, Fitzgerald appeared in a series of films for Universal: The Amazing Mrs. Holliday (1943), Two Tickets to London (1943) and Corvette K-225 (1943).

Going My Way and stardom

Fitzgerald unexpectedly became a leading man when Leo McCarey cast him opposite Bing Crosby in Going My Way released by Paramount in 1944. The film was a huge success and Fitzgerald's performance as Father Fitzgibbon was nominated for both the Academy Award for Best Supporting Actor (which he ultimately won) and the Academy Award for Best Actor; voting rules were changed shortly after this occurrence to prevent further dual nominations for the same role. An avid golfer, he later accidentally decapitated his Oscar while practicing his golf swing. During World War II, Oscar statuettes were made of plaster instead of gold-plated bronze to accommodate wartime metal shortages. The academy provided Fitzgerald with a replacement statuette.

After Going My Way, Paramount signed Fitzgerald to a long-term contract. The studio cast him in a supporting role in I Love a Soldier (1944) and he was borrowed by RKO for None But the Lonely Heart (1944).

In March, 1944, Fitzgerald was involved in a car accident which resulted in the death of a woman and the injury of her daughter. He was charged with manslaughter but was acquitted in January, 1945 due to lack of evidence.

Back at Paramount, Fitzgerald supported Alan Ladd in Two Years Before the Mast, made in 1944 by John Farrow, but not released until 1946. He supported Betty Hutton in Incendiary Blonde (1945) and The Stork Club (1945). In between he had a cameo as himself in Duffy's Tavern (1945) and was borrowed by United Artists to play the lead in And Then There Were None (1945), based on the novel and play by Agatha Christie. In January, 1945 his fee was reported to be $75,000 a film.

Fitzgerald made two more films with John Farrow: California (1947) with Ray Milland and Easy Come, Easy Go (1947), where he was top billed.

Paramount reunited Fitzgerald with Bing Crosby in Welcome Stranger (1947) and appeared in another cameo as himself in Variety Girl (1947).

Mark Hellinger borrowed Fitzgerald to play the lead in a cop film at Universal, The Naked City (1948) which was a solid success. Back at Paramount, he was in The Sainted Sisters (1948) and Miss Tatlock's Millions (1948), then appeared in a third film with Crosby, Top o' the Morning (1949).

Fitzgerald went to Warner Bros. for The Story of Seabiscuit (1949) with Shirley Temple, then to Paramount for Union Station (1950) with William Holden and Silver City (1951) with Yvonne de Carlo. He made his television debut with an episode of The Ford Theatre Hour, "The White-Headed Boy" in 1950.

Later career
Fitzgerald went to Italy to star in the comedy Ha da venì... don Calogero (1952). John Ford gave him third billing in the classic The Quiet Man (1952). It was shot in Ireland as was Happy Ever After (1952) with De Carlo and David Niven.

Fitzgerald appeared in TV on episodes of Lux Video Theatre, General Electric Theater, and Alfred Hitchcock Presents.

He had a supporting role in MGM's The Catered Affair (1956) and was top billed in the British comedy Rooney (1958).

Fitzgerald was top billed in the Irish film Broth of a Boy (1959).

Later years
Fitzgerald never married. In Hollywood he shared an apartment with his stand in, Angus D. Taillon, who died in 1953. Fitzgerald returned to live in Dublin in 1959, where he lived at 2 Seafield Ave, Monkstown. In October that year, he underwent brain surgery. He appeared to recover, but in late 1960 he re-entered hospital. He died, as William Joseph Shields, of a heart attack in St Patrick's Hospital, James Street, on 4 January 1961.

Fitzgerald has two stars on the Hollywood Walk of Fame, for motion pictures at 6252 Hollywood Boulevard and for television at 7001 Hollywood Boulevard.

Filmography

Source:

Radio appearances

See also

 List of actors with Academy Award nominations 
 List of people on stamps of Ireland

References and sources

Further reading

External links
 
 
 
 Photos of Barry Fitzgerald in The Long Voyage Home by Ned Scott
 Barry Fitzgerald at the Abbey Theatre
 Barry Fitzgerald at the Teresa Deevy Archive

1888 births
1961 deaths
20th-century Irish male actors
Best Supporting Actor Academy Award winners
Best Supporting Actor Golden Globe (film) winners
Burials at Deans Grange Cemetery
Irish expatriate male actors in the United States
Irish male film actors
Irish male stage actors
Irish people of German descent
Irish Protestants
Male actors from Dublin (city)
People educated at Skerry's College
People from Portobello, Dublin